Yoo Yeon-seok (born Ahn Yeon-seok on April 11, 1984) is a South Korean actor. After making his acting debut in 2003 with a small role in Oldboy, he resumed his acting career in 2008. His notable works include the films Re-encounter (2011), Architecture 101 (2012), A Werewolf Boy (2012), Whistle Blower (2014), Perfect Proposal (2015), Mood of the Day (2016) as well as the television series Reply 1994 (2013), Warm and Cozy (2015), Dr. Romantic (2016), Mr. Sunshine (2018), and Hospital Playlist (2020).

Early life
Yoo was born as Ahn Yeon-seok on April 11, 1984, in Seoul, South Korea. In his junior year in high school, Yoo decided to take up acting and followed his brother, who was studying another year to enter university, to Seoul and they lived together near the district of Samseong-dong.

While taking acting classes, Yoo met a friend who would later work on the costume staff of film director Park Chan-wook. Remembering that he resembled actor Yoo Ji-tae, he gave him a call about auditioning for a role. Without having to pass out his resume, he made his acting debut as Yoo Ji-tae's younger counterpart in the acclaimed 2003 film Oldboy.

Upon graduation from Sejong University with a degree in Film Arts, he resumed his acting career in 2008 and began using his agency's recommendation stage name, Yoo Yeon-seok.

Career

2008–2012: Career beginnings 
After an extended hiatus from acting, Yoo made his return in the medical drama General Hospital 2.

Yoo took on supporting roles on television, such as the haughty student body president in the horror series Soul and more appealing characters in medical drama Midnight Hospital and Tasty Life. But Yoo received his best reviews yet for playing a sensitive ex-boyfriend searching for his child in indie Re-encounter.

Soon after he became known to mainstream audiences as the rich and spoiled antagonist in the box office hit melodramas Architecture 101, and A Werewolf Boy. He further raised his profile with comedy film Born to Sing, and the fantasy series Gu Family Book.

2013–present: Rising popularity 

Yoo rose to popularity in the nostalgic campus drama Reply 1994 in late 2013. Following his breakout year, he was cast in two high-profile films in 2014: Whistle Blower about infamous biotech researcher Hwang Woo-suk, and Joseon-set period drama The Royal Tailor. Yoo then appeared in the travel-reality show Youth Over Flowers.

In 2015, Yoo was cast in his first leading role on network television as a chef and restaurateur in the romantic comedy series Warm and Cozy, written by the Hong sisters and set on Jeju Island. He also starred in the thriller Perfect Proposal (a remake of Woman of Straw), and The Beauty Inside (adapted from the social film of the same title). Later in the year, Yoo played the protagonist in Le Passe-Muraille ("The Man Who Walked Through Wall"); this was his first stage musical since his professional acting debut (Yoo had previously appeared in theatrical productions while still in university).

In 2016, Yoo starred in the period music drama Love, Lies followed by romantic comedy Mood of the Day. He returned to the small screen with hit medical drama Dr. Romantic alongside Han Suk-kyu and Seo Hyun-jin.

In 2018, Yoo starred in romance melodrama Mr. Sunshine penned by Kim Eun-sook. To celebrate his 15th debut anniversary Yoo held a fan meeting titled “All About YOO”.
He then appeared in the musical A Gentleman’s Guide to Love and Murder.

In 2020, Yoo starred in the critically acclaimed and hit medical drama Hospital Playlist, playing Ahn Jeong-won, an assistant professor of pediatric surgery and reprised his role in season 2 in 2021.

In 2022, Yoo starred in the crime-mystery film Vanishing by French film director Denis Dercourt, as detective Park Jin-ho. In December, he starred in the JTBC series The Interest of Love, playing an employee at a bank.

Filmography

Film

Television series

Web series

Television show

Web show

Hosting

Radio shows

Music video appearances

Discography

Singles

Theater

Book

Ambassadorship 
 Ambassador for the 5th Seoul Animal Film Festival (2022)

Awards and nominations

Listicles

Notes

References

External links

 
 
 
 

South Korean male film actors
South Korean male television actors
South Korean male stage actors
South Korean male musical theatre actors
King Kong by Starship artists
1984 births
Living people
21st-century South Korean male actors
People from Jinju
Sejong University alumni